The Rose–Vinet equation of state is a set of equations used to describe the equation of state of solid objects. It is a modification of the Birch–Murnaghan equation of state.
The initial paper discusses how the equation only depends on four inputs: the isothermal bulk modulus , the derivative of bulk modulus with respect to pressure , the volume , and the thermal expansion; all evaluated at zero pressure and at a single (reference) temperature. The same equation holds for all classes of solids and a wide range of temperatures.

Let the cube root of the specific volume be

then the equation of state is:

A similar equation was published by Stacey et al. in 1981.

References 

Solid mechanics
Equations of state